Villa Ludwigshöhe is a former summer residence of Ludwig I of Bavaria overlooking Edenkoben and Rhodt unter Rietburg in Rhineland-Palatinate, Germany.

Geography

Villa Ludwigshöhe is located at the eastern edge of the Palatinate Forest, west of the small-town of Edenkoben and the municipality Rhodt unter Rietburg in the Southern Palatinate. The Villa is reachable by car. Next to the Villa is the lower station of the "Rietburgbahn", a chairlift, by which the Rietburg can be reached.

Architectural history

In 1843 King Ludwig I decided to build a summer villa.  At that time the Palatinate (from which his father Maximilian I came) belonged to Bavaria. It was to be constructed on the edge of the Haardt hills. In 1845 the necessary parcels of land were bought from the municipalities Edenkoben and Rhodt.

The laying of the foundation stone took place in 1846. The Villa was built by Joseph Hoffmann (Ludwigshafen/Rhine) according to plans from architect Friedrich Wilhelm von Gärtner. In 1847 the architect died: hence Leo von Klenze took care of the site management. The building was finished in 1852.

Ludwig I resided every two years in the months July and August in the Villa. He also celebrated his birthday there.
His last visit at the Villa is dated 1866.

Building

The main building consists of four rectangular shaped two-storey buildings which are grouped around an atrium. Classicistic styles are realized.

Landmarks in Germany
Buildings and structures in Rhineland-Palatinate